Captured may refer to:

 Captured (Journey album), 1981
 Captured (Rockwell album), 1985
 Captured, a 1995 album by The Albion Band
 Captured (Caroline's Spine album), 2007
 Captured (Christian Bautista album), 2008
 Captured (mixtape), a 2018 mixtape by Spice
 Captured!, a 1933 war film
 Captured (1998 film), a 1998 thriller film
 Captured (video game), a video game released in 1986 for the Commodore 64
 "Captured", a song by Heaven 17

See also
Capture (disambiguation)